Antonio Ruiz Hierro (born 5 July 1959) is a Spanish retired professional footballer who played as a defender.

Club career
Born in Vélez-Málaga, Andalusia, Hierro played professionally for local CD Málaga, spending three seasons in La Liga and four in the Segunda División.

In the summer of 1988, after having contributed 22 matches as the club returned to the top tier, he moved to Hércules CF, retiring from the game at the age of 31 after a couple of Segunda División B seasons.

Personal life
Hierro was the oldest of three siblings who were all footballers, and defenders. He partnered Manolo for six years at his main club whilst the youngest, Fernando, had a lengthy spell with both Real Madrid and the Spain national team, appearing on nearly 90 occasions for the latter.

References

External links

1959 births
Living people
People from Vélez-Málaga
Sportspeople from the Province of Málaga
Spanish footballers
Footballers from Andalusia
Association football defenders
La Liga players
Segunda División players
Segunda División B players
Atlético Malagueño players
CD Málaga footballers
Hércules CF players